The Chinese Ambassador to Ireland is the official representative of the People's Republic of China to Ireland.

List of representatives

See also
China–Ireland relations

References 

Ambassadors of China to Ireland
Ireland
China